Carol R. Hughes  (born November 26, 1958 in Val Caron, Ontario) is a Canadian politician, who has represented the electoral district of Algoma—Manitoulin—Kapuskasing in the House of Commons of Canada since 2008. She is a member of the New Democratic Party.

Prior to being elected, she worked as a staff representative for the Canadian Labour Congress. She ran as the NDP's candidate in the 2004 election and the 2006 election, losing to Liberal incumbent Brent St. Denis both times.

She had told the press that she would not run in the 2008 election, but changed her mind after she stopped in Blind River for dinner on her way home from a Canadian Labour Congress meeting, and a couple she had never met approached her and encouraged her to run again. She won the riding in that election, and was re-elected in the 2011 election.

Hughes endorsed Niki Ashton in the 2012 NDP leadership election, and Charlie Angus in the 2017 leadership election.

Hughes has been appointed Assistant Deputy Speaker and Deputy Chair of Committees of the Whole for a second time; she previously held this role in the 42nd Parliament.

Electoral record

References

External links

1958 births
Members of the House of Commons of Canada from Ontario
New Democratic Party MPs
Women members of the House of Commons of Canada
Franco-Ontarian people
People from Elliot Lake
Politicians from Greater Sudbury
Canadian trade unionists
Living people
Women in Ontario politics
21st-century Canadian politicians
21st-century Canadian women politicians